Rail transport in Zambia is primarily provided by two systems:
 TAZARA Railway
 Zambia Railways Limited (sub-systems: Cape to Cairo Railway and Sena railway)

Zambia Railways operates a number of rail lines, including the Mulobezi Railway; as of early 2012, it was still in operation, but in poor repair.

Railway links with adjacent countries
  Democratic Republic of the Congo - Ndola to Sakania then Lubumbashi - , freight only. (For extensions and reconstruction beyond Lubumbashi see the DR Congo article).  The current operating status of Chililabombwe-DR Congo link not known.
  Tanzania -  from Kapiri Mposhi, border crossing at Nakonde, Zambia, to Dar es Salaam, TAZARA railway, passenger and freight -  
  Malawi - Chipata-Mchinji 2010 opening
  Mozambique - no direct link, but indirectly to Nacala, Beira (via Malawi) and Maputo (via Zimbabwe, no continuous passenger services).
  Zimbabwe - from Livingstone via the Victoria Falls Bridge to Bulawayo, freight only.
  Botswana - no direct link, indirectly via Zimbabwe (no continuous passenger services). A direct link is under construction and expected to be open in 2019.
  Namibia - no direct link.
  Angola - no direct link - but indirectly via DR Congo to Benguela on the Benguela Railway - same gauge , but the Benguela Railway has not operated since the 1970s. Reconstruction of the Benguela railway is announced to be completed by the end of 2012; it is already operational from the coast up to Huambo. The Angolan transport ministry plans to build a line branching off the Benguela Railway at Luacano and entering Zambia from Macango

See also

 East African Railway Master Plan
 Economy of Zambia
 Railways in Zambia
 Lobito–Dar es Salaam Railway

References

Notes

Further reading

External links